Chrysorthenches halocarpi is a species of moth in the family Plutellidae. It was first described by John S. Dugdale in 1996. It is endemic to New Zealand and has been observed in the North and South Islands. The species inhabits native bush. Larvae have been collected in October and November. The larval hosts are Halocarpus bidwillii and H. biformis. Adults have been observed on the wing from November to February.

Taxonomy 
This species was first described by John S. Dugdale in 1996. The male holotype specimen, collected as a larva at the Lewis Pass summit and raised to maturity, is held at the New Zealand Arthropod Collection.

Description 

The larva of this species has a green body and brown head. The pupa can be found within a silk cocoon covered in frass.
Dugdale described the adults of this species as follows:

Specimens of this species has been confused with specimens of C. drosochalca, but can be distinguished as C. halocarpi has a purple shaded ground colour to its forewings, has dark throat scales in comparison to the white in C. drosochalca and lacks the white rings on the middle tibia which can be seen in C. drosochalca.

Distribution 
This species is endemic to New Zealand and has been observed in the North and South Island.

Behaviour 
Larvae have been collected in October and November. Adults have been observed on the wing from November to February.

Hosts 

The larval hosts of this species are Halocarpus bidwillii and H. biformis.

DNA analysis 
In 2020 this species along with the other species in the genus Chrysorthenches had their DNA and morphological characters studied.

References

Moths described in 1996
Plutellidae
Moths of New Zealand
Endemic fauna of New Zealand
Endemic moths of New Zealand
Taxa named by John Stewart Dugdale